The 2000 Individual Ice Speedway World Championship was the 35th edition of the World Championship  The final was held on 11/12 March, 2000 in Assen in the Netherlands. 

Kirilł Drogalin won his second world title.

Final 
 March 11–12
  Assen

See also 
 2000 Speedway Grand Prix in classic speedway
 2000 Team Ice Racing World Championship

References 

Ice speedway competitions
World